Mark E. Salter (born September 26, 1968) is an American attorney, veteran, and current Associate Justice of the South Dakota Supreme Court, appointed by Governor Dennis Daugaard in 2018.  He became the 51st member of the court.

Early life and education
He attended South Dakota State University in Brookings, South Dakota, and graduated from there in 1990.  His Juris Doctor degree was conferred by the University of South Dakota School of Law in 1993.

Legal and military career

Following law school, Salter served as a judicial law clerk for the Third Judicial District of Minnesota in Marshall, Minnesota in 1993. Following his judicial clerkship, Salter attended the Naval Justice School and entered the U.S. Navy JAG Corps from 1994 to 1997. During that time he served as a prosecuting and defense attorney. He served in the Naval Reserve until 2002 and was honorably discharged as a lieutenant commander in 2012. Salter left active duty and joined the Cutler & Donahoe law firm in Sioux Falls, South Dakota, where he became a partner and focused on civil and business law. While at Cutler & Donahoe, Salter also served for a year as Turner County deputy state’s attorney. From 2004 to 2012, he worked as an Assistant United States Attorney. 

Salter also serves as an adjunct professor at the USD School of Law, where he previously taught advanced criminal procedure and currently teaches advanced appellate advocacy.

State judicial service 

Governor Daugaard appointed Salter as a circuit judge in the Second Judicial Circuit in 2012, and he took office in early 2013. 

On May 24, 2018, Governor Dennis Daugaard announced the appointment of Salter to the South Dakota Supreme Court to fill the vacancy to be left by Glen A. Severson who would retire in June 2018. He was sworn in on July 9, 2018.

Personal life 

Salter and his wife, Sue, have four children. They are members of Holy Spirit Catholic Church in Sioux Falls.

References 

1968 births
Living people
21st-century American judges
21st-century American lawyers
21st-century Roman Catholics
Assistant United States Attorneys
United States Navy Judge Advocate General's Corps
People from Huron, South Dakota
South Dakota lawyers
South Dakota state court judges
South Dakota State University alumni
Justices of the South Dakota Supreme Court
United States Navy officers
United States Navy reservists
University of South Dakota faculty
University of South Dakota School of Law alumni